Quinolone may refer to:
 2-Quinolone
 4-Quinolone
 Quinolone antibiotics